Han Xinyun and Makoto Ninomiya were the defending champions, but both players chose not to participate.

Eudice Chong and Ye Qiuyu won the title, defeating Kang Jiaqi and Lee So-ra in the final, 7–5, 6–3.

Seeds

Draw

Draw

References
Main Draw

Liuzhou International Challenger - Doubles